Saved from the Sea is a 1920 British silent crime film directed by W. P. Kellino and starring Nora Swinburne, Philip Anthony and Wallace Bosco. It was based on a play by Ben Landeck and Arthur Shirley. It was made by Kellino for Gaumont British under the 'Westminster Films' brand.

Premise
In Cornwall a cardsharper and his heir frame a fisherman for the death of their jealous partner.

Cast
 Nora Swinburne as Nancy Brooks 
 Philip Anthony as Dan Ellington 
 Wallace Bosco as Peter Scalcher 
 Terence Cavanagh as Dick Fenton 
 Mary Saville as Mrs. Ellington 
 Cecil Calvert

References

Bibliography
 Low, Rachael. History of the British Film, 1918–1929. George Allen & Unwin, 1971.

1920 films
1920 crime films
British crime films
British silent feature films
British films based on plays
Films directed by W. P. Kellino
Films shot at Lime Grove Studios
British black-and-white films
1920s English-language films
1920s British films
Silent crime films